"Heroes" is a song by English musician David Bowie from his 12th studio album of the same name. Co-written by Bowie and Brian Eno and co-produced by Bowie and Tony Visconti, the song was recorded in mid-1977 at Hansa Studio 2 in West Berlin. Using a G–D chord progression, the backing track was recorded fully before lyrics were written; Bowie and Eno added synthesiser overdubs while Robert Fripp contributed guitar. To record the vocal, Visconti devised a "multi-latch" system, wherein three microphones were placed at different distances from Bowie and would open when he sang loud enough. Like other album tracks, he improvised lyrics while standing at the microphone.

An art rock song that builds throughout its runtime, Heroes concerns two lovers, one from East Berlin and the other from the West. Under constant fear of death, they dream they are free, swimming with dolphins. Bowie placed the title in quotation marks as an expression of irony on the otherwise romantic or triumphant words and music. Directly inspired by Bowie witnessing a kiss between Visconti and singer Antonia Maass next to the Berlin Wall, other inspirations included a painting by Otto Mueller and a short story by Alberto Denti di Pirajno.

Released in edited form by RCA Records on 23 September 1977 as the album's lead single, initial reviews for the song were mostly positive, with some welcoming it as a classic addition to the artist's catalogue. Bowie heavily promoted the song with a music video directed by Nick Ferguson, and sang it on numerous television programmes throughout September and October 1977, including Marc Bolan's Marc and Bing Crosby's Christmas special. Bowie also released German and French-language versions of Heroes, titled Helden and Héros, respectively. Despite its large promotion, the song only peaked at number 24 on the UK Singles Chart and failed to chart at all on the US Billboard Hot 100, but reached the top 20 in multiple European countries and Australia.

Over time, the song has grown substantially in reputation and been seen as one of Bowie's best songs, with some considering it one of the greatest songs of all time. However, his biographers pan the single edit for diminishing the song's power. Following Bowie's death in 2016, the song reached a new peak of number 12 in the UK. The song remained a staple throughout his concert tours and live performances. Bowie's second-most covered song after 1974's "Rebel Rebel", a version of Heroes by the Wallflowers was positively received and charted in the US and Canada in 1998. Another version by the finalists of The X Factor was a UK number one in 2010. The song has also been used predominantly in advertising over the years and has appeared in several television series and films, including Moulin Rouge! (2001), The Perks of Being a Wallflower (2012) and Regular Show (2017).

Writing and recording

Backing track
 
After completing his work co-producing Iggy Pop's Lust for Life (1977) and various promotional events, David Bowie spent a few weeks devising ideas and concepts with multi-instrumentalist Brian Eno for his next studio album. One idea was using the same G–D chord sequence he had used for Pop's "Success". Eno wanted to call it "Heroes", as the sequence "sounded grand and heroic", and "I had that very word – heroes – in my mind." According to biographer Chris O'Leary, the word also paid reference to German krautrock band Neu!'s "Hero" (1975). Recording for the album took place entirely in West Berlin between July and August 1977 at Hansa Studio 2, a former concert hall converted into a recording studio that had been used by Gestapo officers during World War II as a ballroom and was located about 500 yards from the Berlin Wall. The song was co-produced by Bowie and Tony Visconti, with contributions from Eno.

The backing track began with Bowie on piano and, returning from Station to Station (1976), the core band of Carlos Alomar on rhythm guitar, George Murray on bass and Dennis Davis on drums. The band used the initial chord progression, creating a groove that built into a crescendo, lasting eight minutes. Alomar devised the underlying riff while Murray and Davis provided the "hypnotic pulse". Although he had fed Davis's drums through his Eventide H910 Harmonizer on Low (1977), Visconti used it sparingly on "Heroes", only during the mixing stage, and as such, the drum sound is mostly atmospheric to the room. He did, however, run Murray's bass through a flanger.

According to Visconti, the recording sat for a week before overdubs commenced. Eno brought in his EMS Synthi AKS, a synthesiser built in a briefcase, using its joystick, oscillator knobs and noise filter to create a "shuddering, chattering effect [that] slowly builds up and gets more and more obvious towards the end". Bowie also added Chamberlin and high-pitched lines on his ARP Solina synthesiser. The final addition was former King Crimson guitarist Robert Fripp, who was recruited at Eno's suggestion. Receiving little guidance from Bowie, he cut three takes all based on feedback loops. For each take, Fripp marked different spots on the studio floor with tape and played a different note in each spot, such as A at four feet from his amp and G at three feet, all while his guitar was fed through Eno's EMS Synthi.

When mixing the backing track, Visconti merged Fripp's takes onto one track, creating what he called "a dreamy, wailing quality". He buried Davis's kick drum, finding it "seemed to plod" the track and becoming "more energetic without it", and elevated Murray's bassline, which Alomar augmented on guitar in a higher register. An intended horn section was replaced with a synthesised brass line by the Chamberlin, while the bassline replaced the originally planned string section. With percussion, Visconti added tambourine and struck an empty tape canister with a drumstick as a placement for a cowbell.

Vocals

Similar to Low, Bowie neglected to write lyrics until all but he and Visconti had departed. As such, the backing track for Heroes sat untouched for many weeks and for a time was rumoured it would remain an instrumental. On one day, Bowie requested Visconti leave him alone in the studio to focus on writing lyrics. As he stared outside the studio window, he witnessed Visconti and singer Antonia Maass kiss in close proximity to the Berlin Wall, which he used as the basis for the lyric. Bowie initially claimed that the lyric was based on an anonymous young couple, but Visconti, who was married to Mary Hopkin at the time, contended that Bowie was protecting him and his affair with Maass. Bowie later confirmed the story in 2003, over two decades after Visconti and Hopkin's eventual divorce: "Tony was married at the time, and I could never say who it was. I think possibly the marriage was in the last few months, and it was very touching because I could see that Tony was very much in love with this girl, and it was that relationship which sort of motivated the song." Additionally, he improvised lyrics while standing at the microphone after witnessing Pop use the same method during the making of The Idiot (1977) and Lust for Life.

To record the lead vocal, Visconti devised a "multi-latch" system that would utilise the ambience of Hansa to full effect. Three Neumann microphones were used to capture the vocal: the first, a valve U47, was set up nine inches from Bowie; the second, a U87, was set up 20 feet away; and the third, another U87, about 50 feet away. The two farther mics were routed through a noise gate, a volume controlling device that would turn them on as Bowie's voice reached them. Visconti explained: "If he sang a little louder, the next microphone would open up with the gate, and that would make sort of this big splash of reverb, and then if he really sang loud, the back microphone would open up, and it would just open up this enormous sound." Bowie recorded three takes, the last of which mostly appears in the final song, and was completed in about two hours. Bowie and Visconti immediately recorded the backing vocals afterwards, harmonising in thirds and fifths below the lead vocal. The final mix was done at Mountain Studios in Montreux, Switzerland, a studio that would become one of Bowie's mainstays. An engineer at Mountain, David Richards, would also become one of his regulars.

Composition

Music

Heroes was based on a G–D chord progression and contains five verses, some longer than others, and an outro. Primarily in D major, the verses move from D to G major, along with C major on "nothing will keep us together" and a foray into A minor and E minor on "beat them" and "forever". The song is mainly in the D mixolydian mode, wherein the A major dominant chord is replaced with A minor, likewise swapping from the parallel minor D minor back to the tonic D major.

Richard Buskin of Sound on Sound described the song as a "highly experimental piece of art rock". Biographer David Buckley likens it to a Wall of Sound production, a forceful and noisy arrangement of guitars, percussion and synthesisers. Meanwhile, author James E. Perone finds the song a "great example of contemporary pop music", balancing early-1970s progressive rock on the sysnthesisers to the "avant-garde tone color manipulations" from Eno. According to Bowie, the track was "a combination of Brian's piano technique and [mine] which are both dastardly", turning into a reworking of the Velvet Underground's "I'm Waiting for the Man" (1967), a song long admired by the artist.

Lyrics
Heroes tells the story of two lovers, one from East Berlin and one from West Berlin. Under constant risk of death, they dream of freedom, swimming with dolphins. Like fellow album tracks "Beauty and the Beast" and "Joe the Lion", the song, at its core, represents two opposing forces: the couple's love for each other, and a sense that the Berlin Wall will separate them. Blurt magazine's Robert Dean Lurie analyses it as a "clear nod" to the divided city of Berlin Bowie lived in at the time. The first verse is from the point of view of the man who stresses unity, while the second describes the couple's explicit love and affection for each other. Perone contends that the instrumental passages separating the third verse, wherein the narrator wishes his lover could "swim like the dolphins", represents a transition in the story. The fourth verse is a reiteration of the first, albeit Bowie sings an octave higher and in a near-scream. In the fifth and final verse, the narrator recalls standing and kissing by the Wall while guards fired bullets above their heads. Perone states that this moment captures the sense the narrator's love can "overcome anything" and, as dolphins can freely swim as they wish, the proclamation that "we can be heroes" "gets well beyond anything the listener might have anticipated at the start of the piece".

Nicholas Pegg and Thomas Jerome Seabrook argue that Heroes is not the "feelgood anthem" it is often interpreted as. According to Bowie, the quotation marks in the title were intended to express "a dimension of irony" on the otherwise romantic or triumphant words and music. Describing the song, he stated it is about "facing reality and standing up to it", about achieving "a sense of compassion" and "deriving some joy from the very simple pleasure of being alive". Likewise, Pegg contests the song contains underlying dark themes that juxtapose its uplifting chord sequence and delirious vocal, such as "you can be mean, and I'll drink all the time", which is "hardly the most promisingly heroic statement", while the repeated announcement of "nothing will keep us together" asserts that time is short. Additionally, the pronouncement that the narrator wants the relationship to last "just for one day" harkens back to the dark lyrics of "The Bewlay Brothers" (1971) and represents a shift from the Nietzschean "supermen" themes of Bowie's earlier works into the realm of heroism. Regarding the themes, Lurie stated:

Although Bowie confirmed that the kiss between Visconti and Maass directly inspired the lyric, another source of inspiration included Otto Mueller's 1916 painting Lovers Between Garden Walls, which Bowie and Pop saw at Berlin's Brücke Museum. The painting depicts an embracing couple between two walls representing the brutality of World War I. Bowie also revealed in the foreword of his wife Iman's 2001 book I Am Iman that Alberto Denti di Pirajno's 1956 short story A Grave for a Dolphin, which concerns a doomed love affair between an Italian soldier and a Somalian girl during World War II, provided inspiration. According to Pegg, the destiny of the story's female protagonist is linked with that of a dolphin she swims with, and when she dies, so does the dolphin. Bowie further explained: "I thought it a magical and beautiful love story and in part it had inspired my song Heroes."

Bowie is also recounted to have used events in his own life for the lyrics, such as his then-marital issues, alcoholism and his inability to swim ("I wish I could swim"). Furthermore, O'Leary notes that the phrase "I will be king, you will be queen" is taken directly from the traditional English folk song "Lavender's Blue". In the late 2010s, a story on the Italian Bowie website Blackstar revealed that artist Clare Shenstone, who Bowie met in 1969, had visited him during the summer he recorded Heroes. The two spent a day walking along the Wall, which started, in her words, "with David asking me if I dreamed about him because he dreamed about me. I told him I had just had a beautiful dream about swimming with dolphins."

Promotion and release

After undertaking zero promotional events for Low, Bowie promoted "Heroes" extensively. In early September 1977, he agreed to perform the title track on Marc Bolan's Granada Television series Marc, which was recorded on 9 September and broadcast on 28 September, following Bolan's death from a car accident on 16 September. This particular version, released as a 7" picture disc on 22 September 2017, has an alternative backing track that was recorded with Bolan playing lead guitar and the T. Rex line up of Dino Dines on keyboards, and the rhythm section of Herbie Flowers on bass and Tony Newman on drums. Two days after filming the Marc appearance, Bowie appeared on Bing Crosby's Christmas television special Bing Crosby's Merrie Olde Christmas, performing Heroes and a new duet with Crosby titled "Peace on Earth/Little Drummer Boy". Crosby died on 14 October before the special's broadcast on Christmas Eve 1977. Bowie later quipped: "I was getting seriously worried about whether I should appear on TV because everyone I was going on with was kicking it the following week." On 19 October, Bowie appeared on BBC's Top of the Pops for the first time since 1973, performing Heroes using a new backing track by the artist, Visconti on bass and Sean Mayes on keyboards. Bowie mimed to the new recording during the official broadcast with none of the band present. He sang the song again on the Dutch programme TopPop and the Italian programmes Odeon and L'altra domenica later the same month.

RCA issued Heroes in edited form as the lead single from the album on 23 September 1977, with the catalogue PB 11121 and backed by album track "V-2 Schneider". Its shortened 3:32 edit was made in the hopes of more airplay. Another 12" single, containing both the single and album versions, was released in the US by RCA (as RCA / JD-11151) the same year. On the "Heroes" album, issued on 14 October, it was sequenced as the third track, between "Joe the Lion" and "Sons of the Silent Age". The song's promotional music video was directed by Nick Ferguson. Shot in Paris, it features numerous shots of Bowie against a backdrop of white light and wearing the same bomber-jacket he wore on the "Heroes" cover artwork. Pegg believes the final result is similar to Liza Minnelli's performance of "Maybe This Time" in the Berlin-based 1972 film Cabaret.

In a stunt Pegg describes as confirming the artist's "newfound European allegiances", Bowie recorded special vocals for the track in both German and French, with lyrics translated by Maass for the German release. These singles, titled Helden and Héros, respectively, were issued in their respective countries in September. Additionally, for the album releases in Germany and France, the special vocals were grafted onto the full-length tracks, following the opening English verses. The single's release in a variety of languages and lengths achieved what NME editors Roy Carr and Charles Shaar Murray called "a collector's wet dream". Despite a large promotional push, Heroes only reached number 24 on the UK Singles Chart, but remained on the chart for eight weeks. However, it failed to chart at all on the US Billboard Hot 100, albeit reaching a low number 126 on Record World Singles Chart 101–150. Elsewhere, it charted in Australia (11), Austria (19), Belgium Flanders (17), Ireland (8), the Netherlands (9) and New Zealand (34).

Heroes has subsequently appeared, almost invariably as the single edit, on numerous compilation albums, including Changesbowie (1990), The Singles Collection (1993), The Best of David Bowie 1974/1979 (1998), Best of Bowie (2002), The Platinum Collection (2006), Nothing Has Changed (2014), and Bowie Legacy (2016). The full album track was remastered with its parent album for inclusion on the 2017 box set A New Career in a New Town (1977–1982). The single edit was included on Re:Call 3, part of that box set, while the German single, French single, English-German full-length, and English-French full-length versions were included on an EP in the same set.  Additionally, the English-German version of the song appeared on the soundtrack to the film Christiane F. (1981) and on the Rare album in 1982, while the German single version appeared on Sound + Vision (1989).

Critical reception
Initial reviews for Heroes were mostly positive. Like Low "Sound and Vision", some viewed it as the album's most commercial track. Several welcomed the song as a classic addition to Bowie's catalogue. Record Mirror Tim Lott deemed it "regal" and a "shocking dream[ingly] powerful" song that stands out as the album's best. He found the lyrics are "in a sense throwaway" but display "simple heroism": "Brick by synthesised brick it builds into a leviathan, a monster track that sucks you in and spews you out grinning..." Kris Needs of ZigZag magazine also considered the song a "monster" track with its end result being "magic". Ira Robbins went further in Crawdaddy magazine, hailing the song as Bowie's best commitment to plastic in three years, praising the instrumentation and vocal performance, and highlighted Eno's contributions among the track's best features.

In the Los Angeles Times, Robert Hilburn wrote that despite the dreariness of "Heroes" as a whole, the title track contains "compassion and some fleeting hope". A reviewer for Billboard deemed the song one of the album's best tracks. Writing in Hit Parader, American musician and author Patti Smith praised Heroes as a "pure" and "wonderful" track that "exposes us to our most precious and private dilemma". She predicted that it would become the "theme song for every great movie" and would be "made remade or yet to come". However, Charlie Gillett gave the single a mixed review in the NME, saying: "Well he had a pretty good run for our money, for a guy who was no singer. But I think his time has been and gone, and this just sounds weary. Then again, maybe the ponderous heavy riff will be absorbed on the radio, and the monotonous feel may just be hypnotic enough to drag people into buying it. I hope not." The magazine placed it at number six in their list of the year's best singles.

Retrospective appraisal

Heroes has greatly grown in stature in the decades following its release. Pegg and O'Leary note that it was not until Bowie's performance of the song at Live Aid in 1985 did it become recognised as a classic. Buckley describes this rendition as "the best version of 'Heroes' [Bowie] had ever sung". Reviewing the song for AllMusic, Ned Raggett described it as arguably Bowie's finest song and a "true classic", writing that with Eno, Fripp and Visconti, Bowie crafted an anthem embellished with German influences while still using the "dramatic power" of rock and roll. Analysing his vocal, he wrote: "Starting with an almost conversational tone, by the end of the song he's turning in a performance that could almost be called operatic, yet still achingly, passionately human."

Pitchfork Ryan Dombal described Heroes as "an immortal track all about fleeting wonders", while Ultimate Classic Rock Allison Rapp found that over time, the track become "one of rock's most-loved anthems of hope". In a list ranking every Bowie single from worst to best, the same publication placed it at number one. In Consequence of Sound, Lior Phillips stated that the track "expertly captures the hopeless reality that nothing lasts and that we all must die — and also the inherent beauty in the fact that we all live and love in our time despite that fact". Moby has said that Heroes is one of his favourite songs ever written, finding it "inevitable" that his music would be influenced by the song, while Depeche Mode's lead singer Dave Gahan was hired into the band when founder Vince Clarke heard him singing it at a jam session.

Like critics, Bowie's biographers praise Heroes as a classic and one of Bowie's best tracks, with author Paul Trynka calling it "his simplest, most affecting and most memorable song". Buckley acknowledges it as Bowie's "most universally admired song" and in 2015, wrote that the song "is perhaps pop's definitive statement of the potential triumph of the human spirit over adversity". O'Leary states that the song is "Bowie at his most empathic and desperate; a wish-chant that offers a tiny regency for the spirit". Despite this, biographers mostly pan the shortened single edit for diminishing the song's power. O'Leary argues that the edit weakens the song as the buildup to the final verses is shortened, noting that Bowie's "heroic" vocal starts roughly two minutes earlier than the full album version. Perone agrees that the edit, which starts at the "dolphins" lyric, destroys the song's pacing, tension and impact, making it "not make as much sense". He expresses further criticism to shortening the single, as other highly successful singles of the rock era, such as the Beatles' "Hey Jude" (1968), were longer than the full-length version of Heroes.

Following Bowie's death in January 2016, Rolling Stone named Heroes one of the 30 most essential songs of Bowie's catalogue. Likewise, numerous publications have considered the song one of Bowie's finest, with NME, Uncut and Smooth Radio labelling it his greatest. Others including Consequence of Sound, Digital Spy and Mojo, named it his second best, behind "Life on Mars?" (1971). In 2018, the readers of NME voted the song Bowie's fourth best track. Meanwhile, The Guardian Alexis Petridis placed it at number five in a list ranking Bowie's 50 greatest songs in 2020. He recognised the track as a "weird, ambiguous song" with an "uplifting-sporting-montage-soundtrack ubiquity" that turns six minutes of "pulsing electronic noise, howling guitars and screamed vocals" into "an all-purpose air-punching anthem".

Accolades
In ensuing decades, Heroes has appeared on lists of the greatest songs of all time. In a list of the 100 greatest singles of all time, NME placed at number five. In a similar list, Uncut found it the 16th best single from the post-punk era. In 2004, Rolling Stone rated Heroes number 46 in its list of the 500 Greatest Songs of All Time, and later moving the song up to number 23 on the 2021 list. NME placed it at number 15 in their similar 2015 list. Included by Time in their 2011 list of the "All-Time 100 Songs", Pitchfork also included the song in The Pitchfork 500, a 2008 guide to the 500 greatest songs from punk to the present. In lists ranking the best songs of the 1970s, NME and Pitchfork listed the song at numbers four and six, respectively. The UK's Radio X also ranked it the 12th best song of all time in 2010, and the seventh best British song in 2016. In another list, John J. Miller of National Review rated it number 21 on a list of "the 50 greatest conservative rock songs".

Later chart success
Shortly after Bowie's death, the song charted in numerous countries around the world and was also streamed on Spotify more than any other Bowie song. In the UK, it reached a new peak of number 12. The song spent two weeks on Billboard Hot Rock & Alternative Songs chart in the US, peaking at number 11. Its highest positions were number three on Billboard Euro Digital Song Sales chart, number eight in Scotland and number nine in France. Elsewhere, Heroes charted in Austria (14), Italy (17), Switzerland (17), Japan (18), Germany (19), Ireland (29), Portugal (32), New Zealand (34), Australia (36), Sweden (37), the Netherlands (47) and Spain (59). In Italy, the song was certified gold by the Federation of the Italian Music Industry. Héros also peaked at number 37 in France in 2015.

Live performances
Heroes remained a staple throughout Bowie's concert tours. He later acknowledged the song's impact on live audiences: "In Europe, it is one of the ones that seemed to have special resonance." During the 1978 Isolar II and 1983 Serious Moonlight tours however, the song was usually the second number performed rather than among the shows' encores. Performances from the former have seen release on Stage (1978) and Welcome to the Blackout (2018), while some from the latter appeared on its 1984 concert video and later on Serious Moonlight (Live '83), released as part of the 2018 box set Loving the Alien (1983–1988), and separately the following year. Following Live Aid, Bowie revived Heroes for the 1987 Glass Spider Tour, as seen in its accompanying concert video (1988). The performance on 6 June 1987 at the German Reichstag in West Berlin has been considered a catalyst to the later fall of the Berlin Wall. The song made subsequent appearances during the 1990 Sound+Vision, 1996–97 Earthling, 2000, 2002 Heathen and 2003–04 A Reality tours. A performance from the A Reality Tour saw release on the accompanying DVD and live album, released in 2004 and 2010, respectively.

Outside his tours, Heroes was performed at The Freddie Mercury Tribute Concert in 1992 by Bowie, his former guitarist Mick Ronson and the surviving members of Queen: Brian May, Roger Taylor, and John Deacon. Bowie played a semi-acoustic version at the 1996 Bridge School benefit concerts; the 20 October rendition later saw release on The Bridge School Concerts Vol. 1 album and The Bridge School Concerts 25th Anniversary Edition DVD. The song was also sung at his 50th birthday concert in January 1997 and the Glastonbury Festival in 2000, which was released in 2018 on Glastonbury 2000. The song was again performed in 2001 at the Tibet House Benefit concert and the Concert for New York City.

Cover versions and tributes

Heroes is cited by Pegg as Bowie's most covered song after "Rebel Rebel" (1974). Artists who have covered the song on stage or in the studio include Oasis, the Smashing Pumpkins, Travis, Arcade Fire and Blondie, whose 1980 live version featured Fripp on guitar. American rock band the Wallflowers recorded a version for the soundtrack to the 1998 monster film Godzilla. This version, released as a single on 21 April 1998, peaked at number 10 on the US Billboard Modern Rock Tracks chart in 1998, as well as number 27 on the Billboard Hot 100 Airplay chart and number 23 on the Billboard Mainstream Top 40 chart. In Canada, the single topped the RPM Alternative 30 for six weeks and reached number 13 on the RPM Top Singles chart. British duo Dom and Nic directed the song's music video. The Wallflowers' cover was positively received, with Billboard editor Larry Flick writing that it "beautifully illuminates the heart-tugging quality of the lyrics" but noting the lead singer Jakob Dylan failed to replicate the "irony and edge" of Bowie's version. Artists who have covered Helden include Apocalyptica and Letzte Instanz. In 1997, American composer Philip Glass adapted the "Heroes" album into a classical music symphony, titled "Heroes" Symphony, utilising the title track as the root for the first movement. The same year, Aphex Twin remixed Bowie's original vocal onto Glass's adaptation for release on a Japanese 3-inch CD single.

At Bowie's own request, TV on the Radio covered Heroes in 2009 for the charity album War Child Heroes. A year later, Peter Gabriel released a stripped-down version for his covers album Scratch My Back (2010). The same year, the finalists of The X Factor released a version for the Help for Heroes charity, which reached number one on the Irish, Scottish and UK Singles Chart. Regarding this version, Pegg writes that it introduced "a new generation to David Bowie by subjecting one of his greatest songs to the anodyne arrangements, Eurovision key-changes and sub-Mariah Carey karaoke yodeling which are the core ingredients of The X Factor ongoing mission to eradicate real music from planet earth".

Following Bowie's death, Heroes became a favourite at tribute events and was covered by artists such as Coldplay, Blondie, Lady Gaga and Prince, who performed the track regularly shortly before his own death in 2016. On Twitter, the German Foreign Office paid homage to Bowie for "helping to bring down the Wall". Depeche Mode subsequently released a cover to commemorate the song's 40th anniversary, with Gahan stating, "Bowie is the one artist who I've stuck with since I was in my early teens. His albums are always my go-to on tour and covering Heroes is paying homage to Bowie." King Crimson, who had added the song to their live set in 2000 when the band boasted former Bowie players Fripp and Adrian Belew, recorded a version for their five-track EP Heroes: Live in Europe 2016. Motörhead also released a version on their 2017 album Under Cöver, which was recorded in 2015 during the recording sessions for Bad Magic, and one of the last songs recorded before Lemmy's death that same year. Guitarist Phil Campbell stated, "It's such a great Bowie song, one of his best, and I could only see great things coming out of it from us, and so it proved to be."

Usage in media

Bowie allowed Heroes to be used in advertising campaigns throughout his lifetime, from ads for cell phones, cars and softwares, to HBO Latin American programming, musical video games and sporting events. One such event was the opening ceremony of the 2012 Summer Olympics, where it was played as the British team entered the Olympic Stadium. In 2001, the song appeared in three prominent feature films: Antitrust, Moulin Rouge! and The Parole Officer. On television, the song has made appearances in Glee (2012), the US version of The Tomorrow People (2014) and Regular Show (2017), and on soundtrack albums for Heroes and Ninja Assassin (2009). Meanwhile, Gabriel's version was used in two episodes of the Netflix series Stranger Things in 2016 and 2019. Bowie's original was also featured in the film The Perks of Being a Wallflower (2012), and in the premiere trailer for the Brazilian film Praia do Futuro (2014). Five years later, Helden was played at the end of Jojo Rabbit.

Personnel
According to biographer Chris O'Leary:
 David Bowie – lead and backing vocals, piano, ARP Solina String Ensemble, Chamberlin
 Robert Fripp – lead guitar
 Carlos Alomar – rhythm guitar
 George Murray – bass
 Dennis Davis – drums
 Brian Eno – EMS VCS 3 synthesiser, guitar treatments
 Tony Visconti – metal canister, backing vocals, tambourine

Technical
 David Bowie – producer
 Tony Visconti – producer, mixer
 Colin Thurston – mixer

Charts and certifications

David Bowie version

Weekly charts

Certifications

The Wallflowers version

Weekly charts

Year-end charts

References
Notes

Citations

Sources

1977 songs
1977 singles
David Bowie songs
Epic Records singles
Gang of Youths songs
Interscope Records singles
Irish Singles Chart number-one singles
Oasis (band) songs
Number-one singles in Scotland
RCA Records singles
Song recordings produced by David Bowie
Song recordings produced by Tony Visconti
Song recordings with Wall of Sound arrangements
Songs written by Brian Eno
Songs written by David Bowie
Songs about Berlin
Berlin Wall in fiction
The Wallflowers songs
The X Factor (British TV series)
UK Singles Chart number-one singles